Charles Wesley (July 4, 1896 – March 5, 1944), nicknamed "Two Sides", was an American baseball player in the Negro leagues. He played from 1921 to 1930 with several teams, but he played mostly for the Birmingham Black Barons.

He played with his final team in 1930, the Louisville White Sox. He died in Panama City, Florida, on March 5, 1944.

References

External links
 and Baseball-Reference Black Baseball stats and Seamheads
  and Seamheads

1896 births
1944 deaths
Birmingham Black Barons players
Memphis Red Sox players
Indianapolis ABCs players
Louisville White Sox players
Columbus Buckeyes (Negro leagues) players
St. Louis Stars (baseball) players
Baseball players from Alabama
20th-century African-American sportspeople
Baseball outfielders